Nikdo nic neví is a 1947 Czechoslovak film. The film starred Jaroslav Marvan and František Filipovský. It is a war comedy about two tram drivers who try to save their neighbor Věra who was blackmailed by an SA man.

Cast
Jaroslav Marvan as Martin Plechatý
František Filipovský as Petr Nivý
Jana Dítětová as Véra Budínová
Eduard Linkers as Fritz Heinecke
Stanislav Neumann as Skoula
Robert Vrchota as Karel Bureš
Ota Motyčka as Doorkeeper at Avion Hotel

References

External links
 

1947 films
1940s Czech-language films
Czech war comedy films
1940s war comedy films
Czech resistance to Nazi occupation in film
Czechoslovak comedy films
1947 comedy films
Czechoslovak black-and-white films
Czech World War II films
Czechoslovak World War II films
1940s Czech films